Barueri may refer to:

 Barueri, a municipality located in São Paulo state, Brazil
 Grêmio Barueri Futebol, a Brazilian football (soccer) club
 Sport Club Barueri, a Brazilian football (soccer) club
 Arena Barueri, a multi-use stadium located in Barueri, Brazil